Mark Stephen Monmonier (born February 2, 1943) is a Distinguished Professor of Geography and the Environment at the Maxwell School of Citizenship and Public Affairs of Syracuse University. He specializes in toponymy, geography, and geographic information systems.

Career
Monmonier began his academic career as Assistant Professor of Geography at the University of Rhode Island in 1969. He would soonafter take a position at the State University of New York at Albany in 1970. He joined the Maxwell School of Citizenship and Public Affairs at Syracuse University in 1973, where he continued his career until his retirement in May 2021. He is currently Distinguished Professor Emeritus of Geography and the Environment at the Maxwell School at Syracuse University.

Monmonier's research focused on the twentieth-century history of cartography, in particular, map-related inventions and patents. He also wrote extensively on the use of maps for surveillance and as analytical and persuasive tools in politics, journalism, environmental science, and public administration.

The "Monmonier Algorithm", an important research tool for geographic studies in linguistics and genetics, is based on an article he published in 1973.

In 2008, he received the German Cartographic Society's Mercator Medal.

In 2016, he was inducted into the Urban and Regional Information Systems Association's GIS Hall of fame.

In 2023, the American Association of Geographers awarded Monmonier the AAG Lifetime Achievement Honors, for 
making "outstanding contributions to geographic research, most notably in the fields of cartography and geographic communication" as well as an "extensive record of distinctive leadership at national and international levels".

Publications
Monmonier has authored over 20 books, and his popular written works show a combination of serious study and a sense of humor. Most of his work is published by the University of Chicago Press. He has appeared on National Public Radio interview programs.

For example, in From Squaw Tit to Whorehouse Meadow: how maps name, claim, and inflame, Monmonier discusses topics such as:
 the propensity of conquerors to rename places after those friendly to the new regime.
 the tension between place names assigned by the federal Board on Geographic Names and state and local government agencies.
 the effects of political correctness and racism on place names.

In How to Lie with Maps, Monmonier gives us a different view of maps: Different projections give vastly disparate impressions of the same "facts" or terrain.

Single-authored Books
 Adventures in Academic Cartography: A Memoir (Syracuse, NY: Bar Scale Press, 2014, 2016) 
 Air Apparent: How Meteorologists Learned to Map, Predict, and Dramatize Weather (Chicago: University of Chicago Press, 1999) 
Bushmanders & Bullwinkles: How Politicians Manipulate Electronic Maps and Census Data to Win Elections (Chicago: University of Chicago Press, 2001) 
Cartographies of Danger: Mapping Hazards in America (Chicago: University of Chicago Press, 1997) 
Cartography in the Twentieth Century [Volume Six of the History of Cartography]. (Chicago: University of Chicago Press, 2015) 
Clock and Compass: How John Byron Plato Gave Farmers a Real Address (Iowa City, IA: University of Iowa Press, forthcoming 20224
Coast Lines: How Mapmakers Frame the World and Chart Environmental Change (Chicago: University of Chicago Press, 2008) 
Connections and Content: Reflections on Networks and the History of Cartography (Redlands, CA: Esri Press, 2019)  
Computer-assisted Cartography: Principles and Prospects (Englewood Cliffs, NJ: Prentice-Hall, 1982) 
Drawing the Line: Tales of Maps and Cartocontroversy (New York: Henry Holt, 1995) 
From Squaw Tit to Whorehouse Meadow: How Maps Name, Claim, and Inflame (Chicago: University of Chicago Press, 2006)  
How to Lie with Maps, 3rd ed., (Chicago: University of Chicago Press, 2018) [First edition 1991; French translation, 1993; Japanese translation, 1995; German translation, 1996; Korean translation, 1998 | second edition, expanded, 1996;  Korean translation, 1998; Czech translation, 2000; Chinese translation, 2012 | third edition, 2018;  French translation, 2019; Russian translation, 2021] 
Lake Effect: Tales of Large Lakes, Arctic Winds, and Recurrent Snows (Syracuse, NY: Syracuse University Press, 2012) 
Mapping It Out: Expository Cartography for the Humanities and Social Sciences (Chicago: University of Chicago Press, 1993)  [In the series of Chicago Guides to Writing, Editing and Publishing]  
Maps, Distortion, and Meaning (Washington, DC: Association of American Geographers, 1977) 
Maps with the News: the Development of American Journalistic Cartography (Chicago: University of Chicago Press, 1989) 
No Dig, No Fly, No Go: How Maps Restrict and Control (Chicago: University of Chicago Press, 2010) 
Patents and Cartographic Inventions: A New Perspective for Map History (New York and London: Palgrave Macmillan, 2017) 
Rhumb Lines and Map Wars: a Social History of the Mercator Projection (Chicago: University of Chicago Press, 2004) [Korean translation, 2006}  
Spying with Maps: Surveillance Technologies and the Future of Privacy (Chicago: University of Chicago Press, 2002) 
Technological Transition in Cartography (Madison, WI: University of Wisconsin Press, 1985)

Co-authored Books 
Mark Monmonier and George A. Schnell, Map Appreciation (Englewood Cliffs, NJ: Prentice-Hall, 1988) 
George A. Schnell and Mark Monmonier, The Study of Population: Elements, Patterns, Processes (Columbus, OH: Charles E. Merrill, 1983) ISBN 0-675-20046-6

Edited Encyclopedia 
Cartography in the Twentieth Century [Volume Six of the History of Cartography]. (Chicago: University of Chicago Press, 2015)

References

External links
Author's web site.
Syracuse Maxwell Page

1943 births
Living people
Historians of cartography
American male writers
Syracuse University faculty
Pennsylvania State University alumni
Johns Hopkins University alumni